The Schenadüi is a mountain of the Lepontine Alps, located in the Swiss canton of Ticino. It lies between the valleys of Piora and Cadlimo and on the main Alpine watershed between the basin of the Rhine and that of the Ticino.

References

External links
 Schenadüi on Hikr

Mountains of the Alps
Mountains of Ticino
Lepontine Alps
Mountains of Switzerland